Southdowns Airport  is an airport serving Kitwe, a city in the Copperbelt Province in Zambia.

The Southdowns non-directional beacon (Ident: KT) is located on the field.

See also
Transport in Zambia
List of airports in Zambia

References

External links
OpenStreetMap - Southdowns Airport
OurAirports - Southdowns

Airports in Zambia
Kitwe
Buildings and structures in Copperbelt Province
Tourist attractions in Copperbelt Province